The Northern Ireland border poll was a referendum held in Northern Ireland on 8 March 1973 on whether Northern Ireland should remain part of the United Kingdom or join with the Republic of Ireland to form a united Ireland. It was the first time that a major referendum had been held in any region of the United Kingdom. The referendum was boycotted by nationalists and resulted in a conclusive victory for remaining in the UK. On a voter turnout of 58.7 percent, 98.9 percent voted to remain in the UK.

Party support
The Unionist parties supported the 'UK' option, as did the Northern Ireland Labour Party and the Alliance Party of Northern Ireland. However, the Alliance Party was also critical of the poll. While it supported the holding of periodic plebiscites on the constitutional link with Great Britain, the party felt that to avoid the border poll becoming a "sectarian head count", it should ask other relevant questions such as whether the people supported the UK's white paper on Northern Ireland. Nevertheless, on 5 February 1973, the party's chairman, Jim Hendron, stated that "Support for the position of Northern Ireland as an integral part of the United Kingdom is a fundamental principle of the Alliance Party, not only for economic reasons but also because we firmly believe that a peaceful solution to our present tragic problems is only possible within a United Kingdom context. Either a Sinn Féin all-Ireland republic or a Vanguard-style Ulster republic would lead to disaster for all our people."

The Social Democratic and Labour Party (SDLP), however, called for a boycott of the referendum, urging its members on 23 January 1973 "to ignore completely the referendum and reject this extremely irresponsible decision by the British Government". Gerry Fitt, leader of the SDLP, said he had organised a boycott to stop an escalation in violence.

Violence
The civil authorities were prepared for violence on polling day. They had put in place mobile polling stations which could be rushed into use if there was bomb damage to scheduled poll buildings. Two days before the referendum a British soldier, Guardsman Anton Brown of the 2nd Battalion, Coldstream Guards was shot dead in Belfast as the army searched for weapons and explosives which could be used to disrupt the upcoming referendum.

Violence by both Republican and Loyalist paramilitaries still took place on polling day. The Provisional Irish Republican Army exploded several bombs across Northern Ireland and shot dead a British soldier guarding a polling station in the area of the Falls Road in Belfast. The Ulster Defence Association abducted and killed a Catholic civilian from Ballymurphy. A polling station in East Belfast guarded by the Ulster Defence Regiment was also raided by Loyalist paramilitaries who stole several self-loading rifles.

As a political response to the referendum, the Provisional Irish Republican Army also planted four car bombs in London that day, two of which went off, causing one death and injuring over 200.

Result

The vote resulted in an overwhelming majority of those who voted stating they wished to remain in the UK. The nationalist boycott contributed to a turnout of only 58.7% of the electorate. In addition to taking a majority of votes cast, the UK option received the support of 57.5% of the total electorate. According to the BBC, less than 1% of the Catholic population turned out to vote.

Reactions
The Government of the United Kingdom took no action on receipt of the referendum result, as the result was in favour of the status quo (Northern Ireland remaining part of the UK). It was followed by an Assembly election on 28 June 1973.

Brian Faulkner, who had been the last Prime Minister of Northern Ireland, claimed the result left "no doubt in any one's mind what the wishes of Ulster's people are. Despite an attempted boycott by some, almost 600,000 electors voted for the maintenance of the union with Great Britain". He also claimed that the poll showed that a "quarter of the [N.I.] Catholic population who voted ... voted for the maintenance of the union" and that the result was a "blow ... against IRA mythology".

See also
Referendums in the United Kingdom

References

Northern Ireland border poll
Constitutional referendums in Northern Ireland
Northern Ireland border poll
Northern Ireland border poll
Border polls
Northern Ireland border poll
1973 elections in Northern Ireland